Uruguay recognized Lebanon's independence on November 22, 1943.  Both countries established diplomatic relations on October 25, 1945.

Both countries are members of the Group of 77.

Lebanese in Uruguay

The first Lebanese immigrants to Uruguay arrived in the 1860s. In 1954, there were 15,000 people of Lebanese descent living in Uruguay. By 2009, the number had grown to about 55,000. In 1997, Uruguay's house speaker noted that its 99-seat parliament contains two members of Lebanese origin, including himself.

History

In 1924, Uruguay established an honorary consulate in Beirut, and on November 16, 1928, made it a consulate general for the State of Greater Lebanon and Syria. On October 25, 1945, the Government of Uruguay was one of the first countries to open diplomatic relations with the newly independent state of Lebanon, upgrading their Beirut mission to an embassy. In 1954 the Lebanese President Camille Chamoun visited Uruguay. On May 31, 1954, he signed the first treaty between the two countries in Montevideo.

From 1946 to 1963, Lebanon was represented in Uruguay by an honorary consulate of Lebanon in Montevideo. From 1963, Lebanon was represented through their Embassy of Lebanon Buenos Aires, Argentina. In 1971, Lebanon established a diplomatic mission in Montevideo, with representation at the ambassadorial level.

In December 1999, Zafer El-Hasan, secretary general of the Lebanese Foreign Ministry, held bilateral talks with Uruguayan Deputy Foreign Minister Roberto Rodriguez Pioli about enhancing relations between the two countries in the political, economic and cultural fields. Pioli was visiting Lebanon with a delegation of businessmen of Lebanese origin. The two representatives signed an agreement on cultural cooperation.

There has been controversy in Uruguay about relations with Lebanon. Julio María Sanguinetti of the Partido Colorado, president from 1995 to 2000, said in an interview after losing power that Uruguay was wrong to support Lebanon in disputes with Israel due to Lebanon's failure to combat terrorism.

In May 2007 the Lebanese president Emile Lahoud decorated the outgoing Ambassador of Uruguay, Vos Alberto Rubio, with the National Order of the Cedar, in gratitude for to his diplomatic work. The ambassador later inaugurated a bust of José Artigas, the liberator of Uruguay, commemorating almost 49 years of uninterrupted diplomatic relations between the two countries. Later in 2007 Jorge Luis Jure Arnoletti became the new Uruguayan Ambassador to Lebanon.

Following the surprise election of pro a western government in Lebanon during June 2009,  Uruguay congratulated the President Michel Suleiman, the new government, and the people of Lebanon saying they hoped recent developments would unite them with very close ties.

In April 2011, Foreign Minister Luis Almagro made an official visit to Lebanon and other countries in the Middle East.

Lebanon-Israel conflicts

Uruguay has consistently supported Lebanon in disputes with Israel. When the 1978 South Lebanon conflict broke out, the Uruguay parliament was the only one in South America to take a decision demanding implementation of the 1978 United Nations Security Council Resolution 425, calling on Israel to immediately withdraw its forces from Lebanon. During the 2006 Lebanon War, five Uruguayan families of Lebanese origin were caught up in the conflict, but managed to escape from Lebanon to Syria. Uruguay coordinated with Venezuela to evacuate their citizens. Uruguayan Foreign Minister Reinaldo Gargano stated that Israel should cease fire and begin talks with Lebanon under the supervision of the United Nations.

Resident diplomatic missions

 Lebanon has an embassy in Montevideo. 
 Uruguay has an embassy in Beirut.

See also 
 Lebanese diaspora

References

External links

Embassy of Uruguay in Lebanon
Interview with Uruguayan ambassador Jorge Luis Jure Arnoletti by MondayMorning magazine
Bilateral Relations Uruguay – Lebanon, Embassy of Uruguay.

 

 
Uruguay
Bilateral relations of Uruguay